Dilshad Garden is a large housing colony located in East Delhi, which was primarily developed by Delhi Development Authority. The area located close to Delhi-Uttar Pradesh Border. Dilshad Garden falls under the both Shahdara and Seemapuri constituency of the legislative assembly. Thus, a part of Dilshad Garden falls under MLA of Seemapuri Vidhansabha Shri Rajender Pal Gautam and its other part falls under the MLA of Shahdara Vidhansabha Shri Ram Niwas Goyal.

Dilshad Garden is a residential locality in North East New Delhi. Dilshad Garden is divided into several blocks starting from A to R and several pockets A to SG. Every block has its own market and parks. Most of the residential development is in the form of New Delhi Development Authority (DDA) flats. The Dear park is a public park. 

Schools include Hansard Smarak School, Greenways Modern School and Red Cross Society School and colleges such as University College of Medical Sciences and the Florence Nightingale College of Nursing. Medical facilities include Guru Teg Bahadur Hospital, Swami Dayanand Hospital and Jivan Jyoti Hospital right next door.

Retail centers such as the Cross River Mall, Unity One Mall and Mahagun Metro Mall are within a 7 km radius of the locality. 

The Red Line of the Delhi Metro was the first corridor to be inaugurated. 

Average temperature in Dilshad Garden is between 8  to 40 degree Celsius with high rainfall in the months of July, August and September. Pollution is a concern as AQI was found to be consistently above 250 and the average PM2.5 concentration was above 200 micrograms per cubic metre, three times above the safe standard.

Housing 
24% properties for Sale in Dilshad Garden lie in range of ₹20Lac - ₹40Lac while 22% properties for Sale lie in range of ₹40Lac - ₹60Lac. 2 BHK is the most common room configuration in this locality and accounts for approximate 50% of all the properties for Sale. 59% of the properties in Dilshad Garden are Multistorey Apartment.

Religious Centres
 Ayyappa Temple - Opposite of Pocket R.
 Digamber Jain Mandir, R Block
 Durga Mandir - Pocket R Block nearest temple walking distance from Jhilmil metro station
 Gauri Shankar Mandir - the nearest temple within walking distance from Dilshad Garden metro station
 RadheyKrishna Mandir - near Dilshad Garden
 Shani Mandir and Durga Mandir - Pocket P near Mukherjee School
 Shiv Mandir - Pocket O near O & P DDA Market Badrinath Mandir, Chetak complex. 
 St Francis of Assisi Forane Syro-Malabar Catholic Church near GTB Hospital red light.
 Gurudwara - Pocket B
It also houses Catholic and Orthodox Churches near Tahirpur. This area has several mosques near J&K pocket, mosques opposite to M pocket.

Transport

Dilshad Garden is nearly 4 km from Anand Vihar Interstate Bus Terminus and Railway Station and about 3 km from Shahdara. 

The closest metro stations are Dilshad Garden and Jhilmil on Delhi Metro's Red Line - well connected to all major lines: Pink, Green & Yellow line.

References

Neighbourhoods in Delhi
North East Delhi district
East Delhi district